South Cinque Island or Ga-o-ta-koi is an uninhabited island of the Andaman Islands. It belongs to the South Andaman administrative district, part of the Indian union territory of Andaman and Nicobar Islands.

Geography
The island belongs to the Cinque Islands of Rutland Archipelago and is located between North Cinque Island ( to the north) and Passage Island ( to the south). 
The passage between South Cinque and North Cinque is called Cinque Strait.
South Cinque Island and North Cinque Island,  to the north, are sometimes considered to be a single Cinque Island.

Administration
Politically, South Cinque Island is part of Port Blair Taluk.

Fauna
A new species of blenny, Alloblennius frondiculus was found in the surrounding waters.

References 

Islands of the Andaman and Nicobar Islands
Tourist attractions in the Andaman and Nicobar Islands
Uninhabited islands of India
Islands of India
Islands of the Bay of Bengal